Johannisthal may refer to:

 Johannisthal (Berlin), a locality (Ortsteil) of Treptow-Köpenick borough in Berlin
 Johannisthal Air Field, an air field near Johannisthal (Berlin)
 Johannisthal, a civil parish of Küps, in Bavaria (Germany) 
 Johannisthal, a civil parish of Dersekow, in Mecklenburg-Vorpommern (Germany)
 Johannisthal, a civil parish of Lauta, in Saxony (Germany)